The Church of St. Augustine and St. John, commonly known as John's Lane Church, is a large Roman Catholic Church located on Thomas Street, Dublin, Ireland. It was opened in 1874 on the site of the medieval St. John's Hospital, founded c. 1180.  It is served by the Augustinian Order.

History
The original hospital on the site was constructed by Aelred the Palmer, a Norman living in Dublin, after returning from a pilgrimage to the Holy Land. He founded a monastery of Crossed Friars under the Rule of St. Augustine who would also manage a hospital close by, the Hospital of St. John of Jerusalem. The monastery was dedicated to St. John the Baptist and stood just outside the city walls, and so was known as St. John's church without Newgate (Johannis Baptistae extra portem novem dublinensis).

In 1316 Edward Bruce marched towards Dublin at the head of his army, with the intention of besieging the city. The Dublin citizens, to prevent any danger from his approach and by common consent, set fire to Thomas Street. However, the flames laid hold of St. John's church and burned it to the ground, together with all the nearby suburbs.

About the commencement of the 18th century, an Augustinian Prior rented for their use as a chapel a stable on the western side of St. John's Tower, a surviving fragment of the hospital.

In 1860 it was decided to build a new church. The architect was Edward Welby Pugin, whose father was Augustus Welby Pugin, and assisted by his Irish partner and brother-in-law George C. Ashlin a native of Cork.

The remains of the medieval church were demolished and at the time there was the remains of the 'Magdalen' tower from the old church which stood where the high altar stands today.

Construction on the modern church was commenced at Easter 1862 under the leadership of Fr. Martin Crane, and it took 33 years to complete. One problem was that the foreman and many of the workmen were Fenians, who got in trouble with the authorities in 1865 and afterwards. For this reason the church was nicknamed "The Fenian Church".

The spire, designed by William Hague, and roof were completed in 1874, when the church was opened for masses. The exterior was completed by 1895 and the interior by 1911.

The sculptor Patrick Courtney worked on the internal altar and stone works of the church. The tradition of sculptor/stonemason has continued on down through the Courtney generations at their premises at 9 Thomas Street, and later by the sons and grandsons at Francis Street, Dublin 8.

Church

The church is named after St. Augustine and St. John the Baptist, but is popularly known as John's Lane Church, from its location at the corner of John's Lane.

It was originally not designed to hold bells, but a spiral staircase was added later to provide access to bells. The Bell Ringers Company of John's Lane was formed in 1872 and the bells were first rung on St. Patrick's Day 1873.

The twelve statues in the niches on the tower are the work of James Pearse, father of Patrick Pearse and Willie Pearse. The stained glass in the apse is by Mayer of Munich. The windows are by the Harry Clarke studio and  Michael Healy.

Bells
There is a peal of ten bells hung in the tower, weighing 22 long hundredweight, 3 quarters and 2 pounds, and in the key of D-flat. The bells were cast by John Murphy of Dublin in 1872 as a ring of eight, and installed that year. They were augmented to ten in 1898 with two more bells being cast by Charles Carr of Smethwick. The tower was not originally intended to hold bells, and therefore access is via an open iron staircase which was added later, and which looks out into the nave of the church. The bells are rung once a month.

Notable Friars
Professor & Fr. F. X. Martin (O.S.A.), Chairman of the Friends of Medieval Dublin 1976–1983, and Chairman of the Dublin Historic Settlement Group, tried in vain to save the Viking remains in nearby Wood Quay.

References

External links 

Churches of the Roman Catholic Archdiocese of Dublin
Roman Catholic churches in Dublin (city)
Christian monasteries in the Republic of Ireland
Augustinian monasteries in the Republic of Ireland
1874 establishments in Ireland
19th-century Roman Catholic church buildings in Ireland
E. W. Pugin church buildings
19th-century churches in the Republic of Ireland